Pavel Soukup (born 12 April 1965) is a Czech former cyclist, a participant in the World Championships in the years 1982 - 1990. In 1986 he won a gold medal in team pursuit race with Svatopluk Buchta, Teodor Černý and Aleš Trčka in Colorado Springs. He also finished on the third place in 1983 and 1987 at the same discipline. He missed the 1984 Summer Olympics due to their boycott by Czechoslovakia and competed in the Friendship Games instead, winning a bronze medal in the team pursuit. He competed in the team pursuit event at the 1988 Summer Olympics.

References

External links
 

1965 births
Living people
Czech male cyclists
Olympic cyclists of Czechoslovakia
Cyclists at the 1988 Summer Olympics
Sportspeople from Přerov
Goodwill Games medalists in cycling
Competitors at the 1986 Goodwill Games